Muslim Aremu Arogundade (born 24 June 1926, date of death unknown) was a Nigerian sprinter. He competed in the men's 200 metres at the 1952 Summer Olympics. Arogundade finished second in the 1954 British Empire and Commonwealth Games 4×110 yards Relay (with Edward Ajado, Abdul Karim Amu, and Karim Olowu). In the 1954 British Empire and Commonwealth Games 100 yards as well as in the 220 yards Arogundade was eliminated in the heats.

References

1926 births
Year of death missing
Place of birth missing
Athletes (track and field) at the 1952 Summer Olympics
Athletes (track and field) at the 1954 British Empire and Commonwealth Games
Commonwealth Games medallists in athletics
Commonwealth Games silver medallists for Nigeria
Nigerian male sprinters
Olympic athletes of Nigeria
Medallists at the 1954 British Empire and Commonwealth Games